Acacia muelleriana is a species of Acacia native to eastern Australia.

Description
The plant blooms between August and December and produces simple inflorescences that occur in terminal panicles with spherical flower-heads with a diameter of  containing 5 to 14 cream-coloured flowers. The thinly leathery and glabrous seed pods that form after flowering are more or less flat and are straight to curved and irregularly constricted between the seeds.

Etymology & naming
Joseph Maiden and Richard Baker first described the species in 1893 from a specimen found at the "Foot of ranges forming the southern watershed of the western branches of the Hunter River, New South Wales", and gave it the specific epithet, muelleriana,  to honour Ferdinand von Mueller.

Distribution
It is endemic to central parts of New South Wales from around the Goonoo Forest and the Mudgee district in the south. It is found in a variety of habitat usually around sandstone as a part of dry sclerophyll forest communities.

See also
 List of Acacia species

References

External links 

 Images from Flickr for Acacia muelleriana
 Acacia muelleriana occurrence data from Australasian Virtual Herbarium

muelleriana
Fabales of Australia
Flora of New South Wales
Flora of Queensland
Taxa named by Joseph Maiden
Plants described in 1893
Taxa named by Richard Thomas Baker